Amer Shafi Mahmoud Sabbah (born 14 February 1982) is a Jordanian former footballer who played as goalkeeper.

Club career
Shafi began his career as a midfielder and later on became a goalkeeper. After playing many years for Al-Yarmouk, he joined Al-Wehdat. After his performances in the 2004 AFC Asian Cup, he had offers to play in Europe, but he was not able to leave Jordan due to family conditions and his international career.

International career
Shafi played his first international match with the Jordan national team against Kenya in a friendly match on 17 August 2002, which ended in a 1–1 draw. Shafi is and has always been nicknamed the "Whale of Asia" due to his outstanding and incredible acrobatic saves and performances. 

He scored his first international goal for Jordan in a friendly against India on 17 November 2018, letting fly with a long kick that bounced just outside the India penalty area, catching his opposite number Gurpreet Singh Sandhu by surprise. The game ended 2–1 in Jordan's favour.

He later played in the 2004, 2011, 2015 and 2019 AFC Asian Cup tournaments. On 1 February 2021, he played his last international match in a 2–0 win over Tajikistan in a friendly match.

Retirement and aftermath
On 8 February 2021, he announced his retirement from football. In March 2021, he joined the coaching staff of the national team.

Career statistics

International
Source:

International goals
Scores and results list Jordan's goal tally first.

Honours
Al-Wehdat
 Jordan Premier League: 2007–08, 2008–09, 2010–11, 2013–14, 2014–15, 2015–16, 2017–18
 Jordan FA Cup: 2008–09, 2009–10, 2010–11, 2013–14
 Jordan FA Shield: 2008, 2010, 2017
 Jordan Super Cup: 2008, 2009, 2010, 2011, 2014

Al-Faisaly
 Jordan FA Cup: 2004–05

See also
List of men's footballers with 100 or more international caps

References

External links
 
 Amer Shafi at the Jordan Football Association (available in Arabic)
 
 
 

1982 births
Living people
Jordanian people of Palestinian descent
Jordanian footballers
Jordan international footballers
Association football goalkeepers
Jordanian Muslims
Al-Wehdat SC players
Shabab Al-Ordon Club players
Jordanian expatriate footballers
2004 AFC Asian Cup players
2011 AFC Asian Cup players
2015 AFC Asian Cup players
Expatriate footballers in Egypt
Expatriate footballers in Saudi Arabia
Jordanian expatriate sportspeople in Egypt
Jordanian expatriate sportspeople in Saudi Arabia
Al-Faisaly SC players
Ismaily SC players
Al-Fayha FC players
Saudi Professional League players
FIFA Century Club
Sportspeople from Amman
Egyptian Premier League players
2019 AFC Asian Cup players